InvadR is a wooden roller coaster at Busch Gardens Williamsburg theme park. Built by Great Coasters International, it opened on April 7, 2017.

History 
After a three-month web-campaign on March 19, 2016, Busch Gardens Williamsburg announced that a new wooden roller coaster would be introduced in 2017. The park let fans vote among three names – Viking Raider, InvadR, and Battle Klash – until April 1, 2016. InvadR was ultimately chosen by the Internet poll. On May 30, 2016, it was confirmed that trains from Gwazi, a defunct roller coaster at Busch Gardens Tampa, would be repurposed for InvadR. The attraction opened to the general public on April 7, 2017.

Ride experience
After leaving the station, the train makes two right turns and climbs the  chain lift hill. The train makes a sharp right turn and ascends several airtime hills, before making a right and then left turn into a helix. Afterwards, the train enters the final brake run and returns to the station.

Awards

References

Busch Gardens Williamsburg
2017 establishments in Virginia
Roller coasters in Virginia